East Kerry was a UK Parliament constituency in Ireland, returning one Member of Parliament from 1885 to 1922.

Prior to the 1885 United Kingdom general election the area was part of the Kerry constituency. Representation at Westminster in this constituency ceased at the 1922 United Kingdom general election, which took place on 15 November, shortly before the establishment of the Irish Free State on 6 December 1922. The successor constituency in the new Dáil Éireann was Kerry–Limerick West first established under the Government of Ireland Act 1920 to elect members to the House of Commons of Southern Ireland in 1921.

Boundaries
This constituency comprised the eastern part of County Kerry.

1885–1922: The barony of Magunihy and that part of the barony of Trughanacmy not included in the constituency of West Kerry.

Members of Parliament

Notes

Elections

Elections in the 1880s

1 This remains the largest majority by percentage of the vote in any contested UK Parliamentary election.

Elections in the 1890s

Davitt also stood unopposed in South Mayo. He took up the South Mayo seat and Kerry East remained vacant until the by-election the following year.

James Roche was returned but with fewer votes than his Nationalist predecessors. It was thought he lost some support because as a divorced man he was less popular with the Catholic vote.

Elections in the 1900s

In the closely fought contest of the 1906 election between two nationalist factions, Murphy was returned by a narrow margin:

Elections in the 1910s
In the January 1910 election, the incumbent Murphy (Official Nationalist) was beaten by Independent candidate, Eugene O'Sullivan, who was a follower of William O'Brien's All-for-Ireland League. Shortly after being elected, O'Sullivan re-joined the official Nationalists, but Murphy petitioned the courts claiming that the vote had been rigged and that O'Sullivan had only won through violence and intimidation. The court cleared O'Sullivan of vote rigging but found him guilty of intimidation. The election was declared void, unseating O'Sullivan and creating a vacancy.

In the December 1910 election, Eugene O'Sullivan's cousin, Timothy O'Sullivan, stood for the Nationalists. The All-for-Ireland candidate, Patrick Guiney, contested both this seat and North Cork. Although he lost in East Kerry, he was elected unopposed in North Cork, so both candidates became Members of Parliament, albeit for different constituencies. As earlier in the year, the election was marred by election violence, which included a riot at Castleisland.

In accordance with his party's policy, Béaslaí declined to take his seat in the British House of Commons, sitting instead in the Irish revolutionary assembly, Dáil Éireann.

References

Westminster constituencies in County Kerry (historic)
Dáil constituencies in the Republic of Ireland (historic)
Constituencies of the Parliament of the United Kingdom established in 1885
Constituencies of the Parliament of the United Kingdom disestablished in 1922